Valley Brook is a hamlet located west of Fort Plain, on NY 80 in Montgomery County, New York, United States. Otsquene Creek enters Otsquago Creek just west of Valley Brook, and the Otsquago Creek flows east through the hamlet.

References

Hamlets in New York (state)
Hamlets in Montgomery County, New York